Thomas Spencer Smith (born 25 February 1998) is an English semi professional footballer who plays as a midfielder for Bath City.

Club career

Swindon Town
Smith was given the number 28 shirt at the start of the 2014–15 season and was an unused substitute for Swindon Town in games against Scunthorpe United (home), Gillingham (away) Fleetwood Town (away) and Leyton Orient (home). He made his professional football debut as a second half-substitute in the League One game against Preston North End. Handed the number 31 shirt for the 2015–16 season, he was involved in the Newport County Football League Trophy game as a used substitute. Smith scored his first goal for Swindon against Crewe Alexandra on 5 September 2015. After being assigned the number 15 jersey for the 2016–17 campaign, Smith made his first appearance of the season in an EFL Cup first round tie against Championship side Queens Park Rangers, replacing Yaser Kasim in the 65th minute. The game resulted in a 4–2 victory for the Championship side on penalties after a 2–2 draw in normal time. On 13 September 2016, Smith made his first start of the campaign, in Swindon's EFL Trophy group stage tie against Chelsea U23s. The game resulted in a 2–1 victory with Smith playing for the entire 90 minutes.

On 22 February 2017, Smith joined Irish side Waterford on loan, along with teammate Jake Evans, until June 2017. On 24 February, Smith made his Waterford debut in their 1–0 away defeat against Athlone Town, on the opening day of the 2017 campaign. On 10 March 2017, Smith scored his first goal for Waterford, in their 2–0 away victory over UCD, netting the visitors' second in the 85th minute. Smith made a big impact at Waterford, becoming a key player in the club's title bid. His loan ended in May 2017 and his last appearance came in a 3–0 defeat to the League of Ireland Champions Dundalk in the EA Sports Cup.

On 12 October 2017, Smith joined National League South side Bath City on a one-month loan. Two days later, he made his debut for Bath during their FA Cup fourth qualifying round tie against Chelmsford City, in which he was awarded man of the match despite the 0–0 draw. Following an impressive first month at Bath, Smith's loan was extended until 6 January 2018. On 24 November 2017, Smith was recalled by parent club, Swindon, following increasing injury problems. On 8 December 2017, Smith returned to Bath on a one-month loan and went on to score in their FA Trophy tie against Hendon, which resulted in a 2–1 defeat. On 19 January 2018, Smith again rejoined Bath on loan for the remainder of the campaign.

He was released by Swindon at the end of the 2017–18 season.

Cheltenham Town
On 1 June 2018, following his release from Swindon, Smith agreed to join fellow League Two side, Cheltenham Town on a two-year deal.

On 20 September 2018, Smith returned to Bath City on a four-month loan. The deal was later extended for the rest of the season.

Bath City
On 2 July 2019, after several loan spells, Smith returned to Bath City on a permanent deal, signing a two-year contract. On 27 July 2020, Smith was the recipient of the Vanarama South Player of the Season award after an impressive season.
On 26 February 2021, Smith joined National League side Dagenham & Redbridge on loan for the remainder of the 2020-21 season.

Career statistics

References

External links

Living people
1998 births
English footballers
Swindon Town F.C. players
Waterford F.C. players
Bath City F.C. players
Cheltenham Town F.C. players
Dagenham & Redbridge F.C. players
English Football League players
League of Ireland players
National League (English football) players
Association football midfielders
Sportspeople from Swindon